Dongtai is a coastal county-level city under the administration of Yancheng, Jiangsu province, China. It has a population of roughly 1,170,000 estimated for 2007. Out of the total population, about 260,000 live in the Dongtai urban core, others are distributed in the 23 suburban towns and rural regions (Some famous towns include Touzao, Anfeng, Qingdong, Sancang, Qianggang, Fu'an, Tangyang, etc.). With some  Yellow Sea coast, it borders the prefecture-level cities of Nantong to the south and Taizhou to the west, and is the southernmost county-level division of Yancheng.

.

Administrative divisions 
There are 14 towns under the city's administration:

Climate

Transport 
Transportation in Dongtai is fairly convenient. There are four International airports (Shanghai Pudong, Shanghai Hongqiao, Nanjing Lukou, Yancheng Nanyang) within 200 kilometers. There are also several other domestic airports nearby. The Xinchang Railway traverses the downtown. China National Highway 204, No. 333 provincial highway, Anqiang provincial road, and G15 Shenyang–Haikou Expressway, alternatively known in the province as the Coastal Expressway.

Culture 
The dialect in Dongtai is quite different from Mandarin. The local accent is closely related to nearby Taizhou, Haiyan, Xinghua, Dafeng area.

The cuisine in Dongtai is closely related to Huai-Yang. The taste is not strong, and that is different from most of other regions in China. In Dongtai, people also have chance to eat different seafood.

Tourist can also find fun in Dongtai. Xi-xi ancient town is the cradle of Dongtai and it is also a Holy land of Buddhism. The Yellow Sea (Huanghai) National Park is on the east coastal region of Dongtai and there are also a national everglade protection region and a five-A (the highest level) precious animal protection region nearby

References

External links
Dongtai City English guide (Jiangsu.NET)

 
Yancheng
County-level divisions of Jiangsu